Shayna Rose (born Shayna Rose Mordue; November 3, 1983) is an American actress and singer.

Early life
Rose moved to Los Angeles in 2002 after declining a scholarship to the Berklee College of Music in Boston. She went between acting, singing, songwriting, auditions, and two jobs.

Career
Rose started performing and singing professionally when she was eight years old and appeared in a variety of regional musicals, including "Into the Woods" starring as Little Red Riding Hood at the Denver Civic Theater / Feast of Fools Theatre.  She was nominated for best supporting actress by the Denver Drama Critics Circle for her role as Mary Tilford in "The Children's Hour". In this time period she also appeared in a number of national commercials.  
 
Rose started to land parts in such series as Gilmore Girls, Ugly Betty and Commander in Chief.  Her musical showcases and songwriting also began attracting more interest. On July 4, 2006, Shayna Rose joined the cast of Days of Our Lives in a contract role of Stephanie Johnson, daughter of super-couple Steve Johnson and Kayla Brady. In late November 2006, she was let go from Days after five months. Her last episode aired on January 18.

In 2009, Rose joined Nick Jr.'s band, The Fresh Beat Band. as Marina the drummer.

In mid June–July 2011, Nickelodeon announced that Rose was leaving the show after Season 2 to pursue other projects and marry Arthur Gradstein. She was replaced by Tara Perry as Marina in Season 3.

In 2013, Rose created a new musical series for kids called Shayna's Place.

Filmography

References

External links
 

1983 births
Living people
Actresses from Denver
American soap opera actresses
Singers from Denver
21st-century American singers
21st-century American actresses
21st-century American women singers